LBC, originally London Broadcasting Company, is a national talk radio station in the UK.

LBC may also refer to:

Academic institutions 
 Lancaster Bible College in Lancaster, Pennsylvania, United States
 Lyman Briggs College, a residential college of Michigan State University

Air travel 
 Lübeck Airport, IATA airport code
 The ICAO airline designator for Albanian Airlines
 LBC Express, formerly Luzon Brokerage Corporation, an air cargo, courier and money remittance company of the Philippines

Broadcasting 
 LBC News, a rolling news radio station broadcasting on DAB+ across the United Kingdom
 Lebanese Broadcasting Corporation, a television station based in Lebanon broadcasting in the Middle East, Europe, Australia and America

Other uses 
 LBC Crew, a short-lived collective of Long Beach–based rappers
 Left Book Club, British book publisher active 1936–1948, revived 2015
 Leipziger BC 1893, a defunct German football club
 London Borough Council, local government administrations in Greater London excluding the Corporation of London
 The London Borough of Camden
 The London Borough of Croydon
 The London Buddhist Centre
 The London Bulgarian Choir
 Long Beach, California, also known as "The LBC"
 Lucky Boys Confusion, a rock band from the Chicago suburbs
LBRY credits, the cryptocurrency maintained by LBRY

See also 
 Live in the LBC & Diamonds in the Rough, a 2008 live album by Avenged Sevenfold